Suárez is a town and municipality in the Cauca Department, Colombia.

In October 2007 a gold mine near the town collapsed, killing at least 24 people.

References

Municipalities of Cauca Department